Malvern Hills Science Park is located on a 10 acre (4 Hectare) site in the Barnards Green suburb of Malvern, Worcestershire, England. It is a partnership between a number of partners including: QinetiQ, Malvern Hills District Council, Worcestershire County Council, and the West Midlands Regional Development Agency (Advantage West Midlands), making a total of around 40 companies as of 2019.

Tenants
Current tenants:

 Ascertain Forensics
 Aspenify Inc
 Blue Box Software Ltd
 Collins Aerospace
 Callisto Life Science Partners Limited
 D-Risq Software Systems
 DeltaXML
 ESCCAP 
 European Technology Risks Ltd
 Just Systems Limited
 Lantek
 Metrea LLC
 New Vision Display
 Videns Ltd
 Xoptix

Previous tenants include:

 Defence Diversification Agency
 pSiMedica
 Goodrich Corporation
 Ordnance Survey
 UTC Aerospace Systems

References

External links
 Malvern Hills Science Park

Buildings and structures in Malvern, Worcestershire
Research institutes in Worcestershire
Science parks in the United Kingdom
Malvern, Worcestershire